Yurii Lypa (5 May 1900, Odesa, Russian Empire – 20 August 1944, Shutova village, Yavoriv district, Lviv region, Soviet Union) – was a Ukrainian writer, poet, social and political leader, translator and medical practitioner.

Early life 
Yurii's father, Ivan Lypa, was the well-known Ukrainian poet, doctor and patriot.

At a young age, Yurii Lypa showed an interest in writing. Famous Ukrainian writers Ivan Franko and Volodymyr Samiylenko read his work and commented positively.

Lypa began his education in Odesa and after graduating from school he entered the Law Department of Novorosiyskyi University. In 1917, Lypa became the editor of the  magazine and published his first pamphlets: Liberation of Ukraine Union (“Soyuz vyzvolennia Ukrainy”), Kyivan Kingdom According to Bismarck’s Project (“Korolivstvo Kyivske za proektom Bismarka”), Wear your Awards (“Nosit svoi vidznaky”) and Hetman Ivan Mazepa (“Hetman Ivan Mazepa”). These works were published in his father's publishing house, Narodnyi Stiah.

During the Bolshevik Revolution in Ukraine, Yurii Lypa sided against the Bolsheviks, and fought for the cause of an independent Ukraine. In 1920, Ivan and Yurii Lypa moved to Kamianets, in the western part of Ukraine.

In 1922, Yurii Lypa studied medicine at Poznań University, Poland. After graduation, he moved to Warsaw where he graduated from the Military School of Medicine in 1931.

Medical career and literary development 
Yurii Lypa commenced work at Warsaw University.

Yurii Lypa's first poetry book, entitled Serenity ('Svitlist'), was published in Poland in 1925. In 1929, Yurii Lypa, together with Yevhen Malanyuk, established the literary group 'Tank'. The group's members included the outstanding Ukrainian writers Leonid Mosendz, Natalia Livytska-Kholodna and Oleksa Stefanovych. The young writers gathered to discuss and develop their literary works, incorporating the ideal of reviving the Ukrainian nation. Yurii Lypa's second poetry book Severity ('Suvorist'), which was published in 1931, reflected this ideology, expressing faith in the Ukrainian nation's independent and prosperous future.

In 1934, Yurii Lypa's novel Cossacks in Moskovia ('Kozaky v Moskovii') was published in Warsaw, which was followed shortly by a collection of his literature essays, entitled Fight for Ukraine ('Biy za Ukrainu'). In 1936, Notebook ('Notatnyk'), comprising three volumes of the author's short stories, was published. The stories were mainly concerned with the national liberation movement of 1917–1921. The same year he produced the political works Ukrainian Age ('Ukrainska doba') and Ukrainian Race ('Ukrainska rasa'). Perhaps Lypa's most well known political and philosophical work is his trilogy Cause of Ukraine ('Pryznachennya Ukrainy') (1938), The Black Sea Doctrine ('Tchornomorska doktryna') (1940) and The Severance of Russia ('Rozpodil Rosii') (1941).

Following his father's steps, Yurii Lypa continued his medical practice. He specialised in phytotherapy and was a great phytotherapist. He also published the medical books: Phytotherapy (‘Phytotherapy’) (1933), Healing Herbs in Ancient and Modern Medicine (‘Tsilyushchi roslyny v davniy I sychasniy medytsyni’) (1937) and The Cure Beneath Our Feet (‘Liky pid nohamy’) (1943).

Political activities 
Living in exile did not prevent Yurii Lypa from working on matters concerning Ukraine and its future. In 1940, together with Ivan Shovhenivskyi, Valentyn Sadovsky, Lev Bykovskyi and Vadym Scherbakivskyi, Lypa founded the Ukrainian Chornomorskyi (Black Sea) Institute, a research body focused on the potential economic and political problems Ukraine would face if it gained independence.

With the beginning of the World War II and invasion of Poland, Yurii Lypa was mobilized. However, he soon returned to Warsaw, where he founded the Ukrainian Public Committee, to help eastern Ukrainian refugees. Yurii Lypa was aware that both Soviet and Fascist authorities were monitoring him. Although Lypa had a chance to migrate to a safe destination, he decided to return to Ukraine.

Last years and death 

In 1937, Yurii Lypa married Halyna Zakhariasevych; they had two daughters.

In 1943, Lypa moved his family to the Yavoriv region of western Ukraine. He became an active participant in the Ukrainian resistance movement. While working as a doctor, Yurii Lypa also conducted training courses for medical staff from the Ukrainian Insurgent Army.

On 19 August 1944, NKVD officers apprehended Yurii Lypa. Two days later, his wife was informed that villagers had found her husband's corpse in the garbage tip near Shutova village. His entire body had been severely damaged and tortured.

Awards
He received the Symon Petliura Cross Posthumously.

Bibliography 
1917 – Liberation of Ukraine Union ("Soyuz vyzvolennia Ukrainy")

1918 – Kyivan Kingdom According to Bismarck's Project ("Korolivstvo Kyivske za proektom Bismarka")

1919 – Wear your Awards ("Nosit svoi vidznaky")

1920 – Hetman Ivan Mazepa ("Hetman Ivan Mazepa")

1925 – Serenity ('Svitlist')

1931 – Severity ('Suvorist')

1933 – Phytotherapy ('Phytotherapy')

1934 – Kozaks in Moskovia ('Kozaky v Moskovii')

1935 – Fight for Ukraine ('Biy za Ukrainu')

1936 – Notebook ('Notatnyk')

1936 – Ukrainian Age ('Ukrainska doba')

1936 – Ukrainian Race ('Ukrainska rasa')

1937 – Healing Herbs in Ancient and Modern Medicine ('Tsilyushchi roslyny v davniy I sychasniy medytsyni')

1938 – Cause of Ukraine ('Pryznachennya Ukrainy')

1938 – Race Solidarism ('Solidaryzm rasy')

1940 – The Black Sea Doctrine ('Chornomorska doktryna')

1941 – The Severance of Russia ('Rozpodil Rosii')

1943 – The Cure Beneath Our Feet ('Liky pid nohamy')

Further reading 
“A Prominent Man of Letters Was Lost. Yuri Lypa Fell in the Ranks of the Ukrainian Insurgent Army.” by Vladimir Bezhusko, "Svoboda. Ukrainian Daily", 24 February 1948, page 2.

References 

1900 births
1944 deaths
Physicians from Odesa
People from Odessky Uyezd
Writers from Odesa
Ukrainian male poets
20th-century male writers
20th-century Ukrainian poets
20th-century Polish physicians
Poznan University of Medical Sciences alumni
Ukrainian people executed by the Soviet Union
Ukrainian victims of human rights abuses
Physicians from Warsaw
Polish writers
Polish poets